Wickson is a surname. Notable people with the surname include:

Edward J. Wickson (1848–1923), American agronomist and journalist
Frank Wickson (1861–1936), Canadian architect
Ian Wickson (1955–2012), Australian rules footballer
Roger Wickson (disambiguation), multiple people